Murfeld was the southernmost municipality of the Austrian district of Südoststeiermark. As of January 1st, 2020, the Municipality was split between the Municipalities of Sankt Veit am Vogau (new code 61060) (to the north) and Straß in Steiermark (new code 61061), to the east, in the district of Leibnitz. The Catastral Subdivision of Seibersdorf bei Sankt Veit (289) merged with Sankt Veit am Vogau. The Catastral Subdivisions of Lichendorf (494), Oberschwarza (152), Unterschwarza (213) and Weitersfeld (527) merged with Straß in Steiermark.

(Murfeld is also the name of a different place: a township in the Liebenau district of Graz.)

Murfeld municipality is known for its gorgeous landscape, the Murradwanderweg (a trail for bicycles along the River Mur), its agriculture, a tiny grocery store and the widely known Murfähre (a ferry across the River Mur).

Former Subdivisions
 Lichendorf (494)
 Oberschwarza (152)
 Seibersdorf bei Sankt Veit (289)
 Unterschwarza (213)
 Weitersfeld (527)

Murfeld is the name of the municipality, it is not named after a settlement. Therefore, there is no town called Murfeld.

Population

Politics

Municipal Council
The Municipal council consists of 15 members and since 2015 of the following mandates:
 6 ÖVP - sets the mayor
 5 Bürgerliste Murfeld - sets the financial representative
 3 SPÖ
 1 FPÖ

Communities and organisations

Fire department 

The fire department of Oberschwarza is responsible to guard Oberschwarza and Seibersdorf. In 2007 the fire departments of Oberschwarza and Unterschwarza finished constructing a new fire-station, which was built jointly by both fire departments.
The following fire departments are present in Murfeld:
 FF Lichendof
 FF Weitersfeld
 FF Unterschwarza
 FF Oberschwarza

Sports clubs
 SVU Romann Murfeld
 SG Oberschwarza
 Sportgemeinschaft Seibersdorf
 ESV Seibersdorf
 ESV Unterschwarza
 ESV Weitersfeld

Charity clubs
 Murfelder Adventlauf

References

External links
 Official website
 Fire department of Oberschwarza
 Sports club

Cities and towns in Südoststeiermark District